Aishah binti Ghani (15 December 1923 – 19 April 2013) was a Malaysian politician who served as Minister of Social Welfare from 1973 to 1984 and Head of Wanita UMNO women's Malaysia from 1972 to 1984.

Background
Born in Kampung Sungai Serai, Hulu Langat, Selangor, Aishah was a Minangkabau descent from Sijunjung, West Sumatra. She acquired education early in Bukit Raya Malay School, Cheras, Selangor. Ghani attended secondary school at the Diniyah Putri school in Padang Panjang, West Sumatra, Indonesia, from 1936 to 1939. The school had been founded by Rahmah el Yunusiyah in 1923. In the year 1940 until 1943, she joined the College of Islamic Universities in Padang, West Sumatra, and then went to London in April 1955 and graduated journalism from Regent Street Polytechnic in London in December 1958.

Political career
Aishah's involvement in politics began as soon as the Malay Nationalist Party  (PKMM) was founded in 1945, and she became a member of the women's wing and thus led the so-called  Conscious Women's Front (AWAS).

At that time, she also worked as a journalist Pelita Malaya, PKMM official tongue. Aisha out of AWAS in 1946 (AWAS then banned by the government in 1948) and joined the rally which demanded independence at the Sultan Sulaiman Club, Kuala Lumpur, in March the same year. She joined Umno New Village in 1949 and was appointed as secretary.

Aishah on her return from her studies in London in 1959, worked as a journalist again, this time for the Berita Harian, as well as the editor in Group Releases New Straits Times. She put both her office in 1963 when she became a member of the UMNO Supreme Council and vice-chairman of Wanita Umno. On 13 September 1962, she was appointed the Senator and assented to the Yang di-Pertuan Agong. 

She was the first woman in Malaysia to be a senator and was Malaysia's first woman representative to the General Assembly of the United Nations (UN). From 1967 to 1972, Aisha was Malaysia's representative to the United Nations Conference on the Status of Women Commission. She also served as Secretary of State for Wanita Umno Selangor between 1960 and 1972.

In 1972, Aishah was appointed the Chief of UMNO Wanita Malaysia, an organisation which she headed for 12 years until 1984. On 1 March 1973, she was appointed as Minister of Social Welfare after the retirement of Fatimah Hashim and held this position for 11 years before ending her service in 1984. During her tenure as Minister of General Welfare, she launched the Yayasan Kebajikan Negara (National Welfare Foundation) (YKN), an organisation that is still functioning today. Aishah was Permanent Chairman of UMNO Wanita Malaysia from 1986 until 2013.

After career
After her political career, Aishah became as a chairman of the Malaysian Handicraft Development Corporation (Kraftangan Malaysia) from 1985 until 1997. She was a member of the Tun Abdul Razak Foundation, and Chairman of the Centre for Protection of Women Darsaadah. Also, she is Chairman of the Koperasi Wanita Jaya Murni Berhad since its inception in 1975. As if this was not enough, Aishah also devoted her time in the field of business, and was the chairman and / or director for at least seven private limited companies.

Death
Aishah died on 19 April 2013 at the age of 90. She was buried at Bukit Kiara Muslim Cemetery, Kuala Lumpur.

Honours

Honours of Malaysia
  :
  Recipient of the Malaysian Commemorative Medal (Silver) (PPM) (1965)
  Companion of the Order of the Defender of the Realm (JMN) (1966)
  Commander of the Order of the Defender of the Realm (PMN) – Tan Sri (1985)
  :
  Knight Commander of the Order of the Crown of Selangor (DPMS) – Datin Paduka (1977)
  Knight Grand Commander of the Order of the Crown of Selangor (SPMS) – Datin Paduka Seri (1999)
 :
  Member of the Order of Kinabalu (ADK) (1971)

Awards and recognitions

Honours
 1966 : Johan Mangku Negara (J.M.N.) by His Majesty the Yang di-Pertuan Agong
 1977 : Dato' Paduka Mahkota Selangor Second Class (DPMS) which carries the title 'Datin Paduka' by the Sultan of Selangor
 1985 : Panglima Mangku Negara (P.M.N.) which carries the title Tan Sri by His Majesty the Yang di-Pertuan Agong
 1986 : Honorary Doctorate of Law by Universiti Sains Malaysia (USM)
 1999 : Seri Paduka Mahkota Selangor First Class (SPMS) which carries the title 'Datin Paduka Seri' by the Sultan of Selangor
 2002 : Honorary Doctorate in Political Science by the National University of Malaysia (UKM).

Places named after her
Several places were named after her, including:
 Kolej Tan Sri Aishah Ghani, a residential college at Universiti Malaysia Perlis, Bintong, Perlis

References

1923 births
2013 deaths
People from Selangor
Women members of the Dewan Rakyat
Women members of the Dewan Negara
Women in Kedah politics
Malaysian people of Malay descent
Malaysian people of Minangkabau descent
Minangkabau people
Malaysian Muslims
United Malays National Organisation politicians
Members of the Dewan Negara
Members of the Dewan Rakyat
Malaysian journalists
Malaysian women journalists
Malaysian editors
Government ministers of Malaysia
Permanent Representatives of Malaysia to the United Nations
Malaysian corporate directors
Malaysian chairpersons of corporations
Women government ministers of Malaysia
20th-century Malaysian women politicians
20th-century Malaysian politicians
Malaysian women diplomats
Companions of the Order of the Defender of the Realm
Commanders of the Order of the Defender of the Realm
Malaysian women ambassadors
British Malaya expatriates in the Dutch East Indies
Malaysian expatriates in the United Kingdom
Knights Grand Commander of the Order of the Crown of Selangor
Knights Commander of the Order of the Crown of Selangor